French Camp is a town in Choctaw County, Mississippi, United States. The population was 174 at the 2010 census, down from 393 in 2000.

History
The town dates back to circa 1810, when a Frenchman, Louis Lefleur, established a stand or trading post and inn, on the Natchez Trace. The Choctaw natives and others in the area called it the Frenchman's Camp. Later it was shortened to French Camp.

Geography
French Camp is located in western Choctaw County at  (33.293936, -89.400248). It is bordered to the south by Attala County. The Natchez Trace Parkway passes through the town, crossing Mississippi Highway 413 just west of the center of town.

Demographics

As of the census of 2000, there were 393 people, 68 households, and 42 families residing in the town. The population density was 398.1 people per square mile (153.3/km2). There were 74 housing units at an average density of 75.0 per square mile (28.9/km2). The racial makeup of the town was 92.37% White, 5.09% African American, 1.53% from other races, and 1.02% from two or more races. Hispanic or Latino of any race were 1.27% of the population.

There were 68 households, out of which 26.5% had children under the age of 18 living with them, 54.4% were married couples living together, 4.4% had a female householder with no husband present, and 36.8% were non-families. 36.8% of all households were made up of individuals, and 17.6% had someone living alone who was 65 years of age or older. The average household size was 2.43 and the average family size was 3.19.

In the town, the population was spread out, with 48.6% under the age of 18, 9.4% from 18 to 24, 13.5% from 25 to 44, 16.5% from 45 to 64, and 12.0% who were 65 years of age or older. The median age was 18 years. For every 100 females, there were 113.6 males. For every 100 females age 18 and over, there were 96.1 males.

The median income for a household in the town was $26,250, and the median income for a family was $27,188. Males had a median income of $13,750 versus $12,813 for females. The per capita income for the town was $5,047. (The lowest in Mississippi) About 17.1% of families and 64.5% of the population were below the poverty line, including 70.5% of those under age 18 and none of those age 65 or over.

Government and infrastructure
The United States Postal Service operates the French Camp Post Office.

Education
The town of French Camp is served by the Choctaw County School District and the private French Camp Academy.

French Camp Elementary School
French Camp Elementary School, operated by the Choctaw County School District is in French Camp.
French Camp Academy
French Camp Academy, a Christian boarding school, is in the town.

Points of interest 
 Rainwater Observatory and Planetarium
 French Camp Town Hall (also houses the French Camp Volunteer Fire Department)
 French Camp Academy Campus
 Natchez Trace Historic Village including
Council House Cafe

 WFCA (FM)

Gallery

References

External links

 French Camp Historic District

Towns in Choctaw County, Mississippi
Towns in Mississippi